Jean-Louis Bianco (born 12 January 1943) is a French politician and civil servant who served as Minister of Social Affairs and Integration from 1991 to 1992 and Minister of Equipment, Transport and Housing from 1992 to 1993 under President François Mitterrand. A member of the Socialist Party (PS), he was later elected to the National Assembly in 1997, where he represented the 1st constituency of Alpes-de-Haute-Provence for three terms. Bianco also held a number of local elective mandates at the municipal, departmental and regional level from 1992 to 2012.

Early career
Bianco is of Italian descent through his father who fled Italian Fascism. An alumnus of the École nationale d'administration, he joined the Conseil d'État in 1971 with the rank of auditor. In 1978 he was his appointed master of requests. In 1994, he was made a councillor. Bianco also served as president of the National Forests Office (ONF) from 1985 to 1991.

Political career
Appointed chargé de mission at the Élysée in 1981, Bianco became President François Mitterrand's chief of staff in 1982, a role he retained until 1991, when he was named Minister of Social Affairs and Integration under Prime Minister Édith Cresson. In 1992, he was named Minister of Equipment, Transport and Housing under Prime Minister Pierre Bérégovoy. He left the position following the 1993 legislative election, as the right led by Jacques Chirac regained a parliamentary majority in the National Assembly.

As a member of the Socialist Party, he represented the 1st constituency of the Alpes-de-Haute-Provence department from 1997 to 2012. In Parliament, he sat with the Socialist, radical, citizen and miscellaneous left group.

References

See also
 National Forests Office (France)

1943 births
Living people
People from Neuilly-sur-Seine
French people of Italian descent
Politicians from Île-de-France
Socialist Party (France) politicians
Transport ministers of France
French Ministers of Labour and Social Affairs
Deputies of the 11th National Assembly of the French Fifth Republic
Deputies of the 12th National Assembly of the French Fifth Republic
Deputies of the 13th National Assembly of the French Fifth Republic
Members of the Conseil d'État (France)
Lycée Janson-de-Sailly alumni
Mines Paris - PSL alumni
École nationale d'administration alumni